Donn Cambern (October 9, 1929 – January 18, 2023) was an American film editor with more than three dozen feature film credits. His editing of Romancing the Stone (1984) was nominated for an Academy Award for Best Film Editing along with fellow editor Frank Morriss, and his editing of Easy Rider (1969) has been noted as particularly innovative and influential. He was awarded the American Cinema Editors Career Achievement Award in 2004. 

Cambern was born in Los Angeles, California, and obtained a B.A. in music from UCLA. Cambern began his career as a music editor for The Andy Griffith Show before moving into film editing.

Officially credited with editing The Last Picture Show (1971), Cambern's involvement was called into question in the 1999 documentary, The Last Picture Show: A Look Back. In the documentary, Peter Bogdanovich said that after shooting the film, he went back to Los Angeles to edit it on a Moviola. When finished editing the entire picture, he refused to credit himself as editor, reasoning that credits beyond that of director and co-writer would look 'ridiculous'. After being informed that the Motion Picture Editors Guild required crediting an editor, he suggested Donn Cambern who had been editing another film in the next office over and had helped Bogdanovich with some purchasing paperwork. In the documentary, Cybill Shepherd said that when she went to stay with Bogdanovich during that time, it was disappointing because he was too busy editing the film. Cambern disputes this, stating that Bogdanovich did do an edit of the film, which he screened for a selection of guests, including Jack Nicholson, Bob Rafelson and himself. The consensus was the film was going to be great, but needed further editing to achieve its full potential. Bogdanovich invited Cambern to edit the film further and Cambern made significant contributions to the film's final form.

One of Cambern's favorite stories and something for which he is often remembered is the editing of the final sequence of the Robert Wise film The Hindenburg (1975), in which Cambern manages to keep the Hindenburg blowing up for almost 10 minutes when the actual event lasted little more than 37 seconds.

In 2007, Cambern was senior filmmaker-in-residence at the American Film Institute Conservatory. Cambern had been elected as a member of the American Cinema Editors. Cambern had served twice (1990–94, 1997–99) as Vice-President of the Board of Governors for the Academy of Motion Picture Arts and Sciences. From 1991-2002, he was  President of the Motion Picture Editors Guild.

Cambern was the inaugural recipient of the Guild's Fellowship and Service Award in 2007.

Cambern died of complications from a fall on January 18, 2023, at the Providence Saint Joseph Medical Center in Burbank, California. He was 93.

Selected filmography
(director of each film indicated in parenthesis)
2000 Years Later (Tenzer – 1969)
Easy Rider (Hopper – 1969)
Drive, He Said (Nicholson – 1971)
The Last Picture Show (Bogdanovich – 1971)
Steelyard Blues (supervising film editor; Myerson – 1973)
Blume in Love (Mazursky – 1973)
Cinderella Liberty (supervising film editor; Rydell – 1973)
The Hindenburg (Wise – 1975)
Alex & the Gypsy (Korty – 1976)
The Other Side of Midnight (Jarrott – 1977)
The End (Reynolds – 1978)
Hooper (Needham – 1978)
Time After Time (Meyer – 1979)
Willie & Phil (Mazursky – 1980)
Smokey and the Bandit II (Needham – 1980)
Excalibur (uncredited; Boorman – 1981)
The Cannonball Run (Needham – 1981)
Paternity (Steinberg – 1981)
Tempest (Mazursky – 1982)
Going Berserk (Steinberg – 1983)
Romancing the Stone (Zemeckis – 1984)
Jo Jo Dancer, Your Life Is Calling (Pryor – 1986)
Big Trouble (Cassavetes – 1986)
Harry and the Hendersons (Dear – 1987)
Casual Sex? (Robert – 1988)
Feds (Goldberg – 1988)
Twins (Reitman – 1988)
Ghostbusters II (Reitman – 1989)
Eyes of an Angel (Harmon – 1991)
The Butcher's Wife (Hughes – 1991)
The Bodyguard (Jackson – 1992)
Blood In Blood Out (additional film editor; Hackford – 1993)
Rookie of the Year (Stern – 1993)
Major League II (Ward – 1994)
Little Giants (Dunham – 1994)
The Glimmer Man (Gray – 1996)
A Thousand Acres (additional editor; Moorhouse – 1997)

References

External links

1929 births
2023 deaths
American film editors
American Cinema Editors
Film people from Los Angeles
University of California, Los Angeles alumni